Bethel Baptist Church is a historic church in Pataskala, Ohio. It was built in 1855 in the early Romanesque Revival style. It is the oldest church in the city of Pataskala, and was added to the National Register in 1983.

References

Baptist churches in Ohio
Churches on the National Register of Historic Places in Ohio
Romanesque Revival church buildings in Ohio
Churches completed in 1855
Buildings and structures in Licking County, Ohio
National Register of Historic Places in Licking County, Ohio